The Opel Senator is a full-size executive car (E-segment) produced by the German automaker Opel, two generations of which were sold in Europe from 1978 until 1993. A saloon, its first incarnation was also available with a fastback coupé body as the Opel Monza and Vauxhall Royale Coupé.

Through the international divisions of General Motors, it was also known in various markets as the Chevrolet Senator, Daewoo Imperial (in South Korea), Vauxhall Royale (until 1983) and Vauxhall Senator (which took the place of the Royale on Vauxhall models when the Opel brand was phased out from 1983). It was also sold as the Opel Kikinda in Yugoslavia, where it was produced under licence by IDA-Opel in Kikinda, Serbia, after which it was named.

The original Senator shared its platform with the smaller Opel Rekord, the latter being lengthened to make the Senator. The second generation of that car, from 1987, shared its base with the Rekord's Opel Omega successor, which was again lengthened to produce the Senator.


Senator A (1978–1986)

The Senator A was a lengthened version of the Opel Rekord E, complemented by a three-door fastback coupé version on the same platform called the Opel Monza, which was planned as a successor for the Opel Commodore coupé.

Names and markets 

The Senator A and Monza were initially sold in the United Kingdom as the Vauxhall Royale (and Vauxhall Royale Coupé), because the Opel marque was not so well established, but they were also offered under their Opel names. The vehicle was also available in South Africa as the Chevrolet Senator until 1982, when it was rebadged as an Opel. The later South African Opel Senator received Australian-built, six-cylinder engines. In Serbia, the locally assembled Senator received the 2.5-litre six and was badged the "Opel Kikinda".

Engines 
The three speed automatic transmission was Opel's own design introduced in 1969, and was manufactured in Opel's transmission plant in Strasbourg, it was modified to cope with the new and improved power outputs.

Opel's own four speed manual transmission was not up to the job and they turned to transmission producer Getrag, who installed their 264 four speed manual gearbox in the early four cylinder Monzas. This was replaced by the five speed 240 for the 2.5 and 2.8 engines, and the 265 gearbox for the 3.0E.

The straight-six engines were all of the Opel cam-in-head engine design, as used in the earlier Commodore models and originating from the 1.7 and 1.9 litre straight four engines first used in the 1966 Kadett and Rekord. Opel would stick with the CIH engine design up until the 2.4 Frontera in 1993.

In June 1981, the fuel injected 2.5E engine also used in the smaller Commodore was added to the Senator/Monza lineup. With  it was very close to the now irrelevant 2.8 and its , and the 2.8S was discontinued in 1982.

Facelift (A2)
The original Senator and Monza were facelifted in November 1982, although the Senator "A2" (as it is usually called) only went on sale in March 1983. In the United Kingdom, it was initially sold only as an Opel, before being rebadged as a Vauxhall in 1984. The A2 Monza was only sold as an Opel.

The facelifted car looked similar to its predecessor, with relatively minor changes: smoothed-off headlights increased in size, and chrome parts were changed to a matt black or colour coded finish. The car was much more slippery, with drag resistance down (from 0.45 to 0.36 ). The top of the range 3.0E received upgraded Bosch LE-Jetronic fuel injection.

Interiors were improved with an altered dashboard and the new instrument pack with larger dials used in the Rekord E2, and engines changed. Now, the fuel-injected straight-four  two-liter cam-in-head unit from the Rekord E2 was available, although with little fanfare; this and the 2.5 essentially replaced the Commodore which was itself quietly retired in 1982. In March 1983 a 2.3-litre turbodiesel (shared with the Rekord) became available, and a few months later ABS-brakes (hitherto only available for the Senator CD) became an available option across the entire Senator/Monza range. The 2.0E was replaced by the torquier 2.2E, still with the same max power. Only the 3.0E engine remained untouched, although its name was changed to 3.0i. On the transmission side, the Strasbourg-built THM180 three-speed automatic was replaced by a four-speed unit. For the 1985 model year, the digital instrument display introduced in the Kadett E was available on the top models, although buyers could opt for the conventional analogue dials as a delete option. The trim surrounding the windows was more blacked out than before as well, although ample chrome remained.  the four-cylinder models were never sold in Vauxhall form in the United Kingdom.

Shortly thereafter, in November 1984 a supercharged version (Comprex) was shown - at the time, the only production car in the world to use this technique. Going on sale in 1985, this very rare experimental version (1,000 units planned) were officially built by Irmscher rather than Opel. The Comprex offered  and a  top speed, and acceleration figures showed a twelve percent improvement over the turbodiesel. Like the other Rekord and Senator diesels it had a pronounced bulge in the bonnet. The Comprex offered marginally higher power than the turbodiesel, but more importantly, 90 percent of the maximum torque was available from 1300 rpm.

Variants 
A four-wheel drive conversion was also available, engineered by Ferguson, who had previously provided similar modifications for the Jensen FF. Rather expensive, this could also be retrofitted to an existing car. The system uses a viscous coupling to distribute power with a 60/40 rearward bias, to improve traction whilst maintaining the Senator's handling characteristics. These were used by British Forces Germany under the BRIXMIS (British Commanders' in Chief Mission to the Soviet Forces in Germany) operations for the collection of technical intelligence. The same kit was also used by Bitter Cars for a four-wheel-drive version of their SC coupé, beginning in the end of 1981.

A limited edition convertible edition was also available in Germany, where the company "Keinath" reinforced the car heavily, and this added to the all round weight to the car.

Senator B (1987–1993)

A new model, the Senator B (marketed without the "B" suffix), arrived in the spring of 1987, a long wheelbase version of the Opel Omega. There was no Monza equivalent.

There were various versions of the Senator B: twelve valve 2.5 L and 3.0 L sized engines were released in 1987 along with a luxury "CD" model with the 3.0 L engine. The CD version boasted Electronic adjustable suspension, "ERC" for the first time in a mass-produced European car. air conditioning, heated seats also in the backseat, genuine walnut panels, leather covered centre console, trip computer and cruise control.

The cars were available with either five speed manual or four speed automatic gearboxes. A digitally controlled 4-speed automatic from Aisin-Warner equipped with three different switching programs Sport, Economy and Winter.
It was also equipped with torque delay at each shift, called "torque retard" for not notable gear changes.
In winter mode the car starts on the third gear and switches immediately to fourth as soon as possible to prevent spinning wheels and instability. This mode remains to the speed of 80 km/h and then automatically switches off.
The gearbox also had built-in diagnostic system and emergency program.
Later Lexus and Volvo used similar versions of this transmission.
As a luxury car, there were many options but much was also standard, option was leather seats and heated seats both front and rear, electronic air conditioning including refrigerator in the glove box.

LCD instrumentation was an option, digital electronic power steering ZF-Servotronic, the same as in the BMW 7 Series, was standard, as was a new front axle design which allowed the axle to slide under the car in a crash and thus increasing the length of the deformation zone and prevent deformation of the footwell. The 3.0 24V was equipped with BBS styled multispoke alloy wheels made by Ronal.

This model was very popular with the police force in the United Kingdom, with several cars being supplied to upgraded police specification. The main feature of the new engine was a "Dual Ram" system, increasing torque at low engine speeds by means of a redirected air flow system engaged at 4,000 rpm.

For 1990 the 2.5 L was replaced by a 2.6 L Dual Ram, and the 3.0 L twelve valve was deleted from the range in 1992. CD versions of the 2.6 L (UK market only), and a 24 valve 3.0 L were available up to the model's withdrawal in 1993.

With the second generation Omega presented at the end of 1993, and available for sale from March 1994, Opel considered that it was sufficiently represented in the upper end of the market by the top specification Omega B. Production of the Opel Senator B ended in the Autumn/Fall of 1993 with a disappointing 69,943 cars produced since the car's launch six and a half years earlier. Annual production had slumped from 14,007 in 1990 to 5,952 in 1992, with only 2,688 cars produced in 1993

References

External links

 Website about Opel Senator/Monza
 carpics – Opel Monza pictures

Senator
Sedans
Flagship vehicles
Rear-wheel-drive vehicles
Cars introduced in 1978
1970s cars
1980s cars
1990s cars